The Great South League is a collegiate summer baseball league which comprises teams located in the U.S. states of Georgia, Florida, Alabama, South Carolina, North Carolina, and Virginia. Teams consist of current college baseball players from the JUCO, NAIA, and NCAA levels who wish to further their skills by practicing and playing during the summer off-season.

History of the Great South League 
In the fall of 2005, the Georgia Collegiate League was founded by the Georgia Dugout Club in order to promote wood-bat summer league baseball within the state of Georgia. After two successful seasons of playing ball, the GCL formally adopted the new name, the Great South League, and expanded to include 12 teams in the states of Georgia, Florida, and Alabama for the 2008 season. Currently, the GSL has four divisions with 24 teams spread across the Southeast. The GSL seeks to allow college baseball players of all intercollegiate levels continue their development and improve their style of play. Bill Park Jr (aka Liam Parke) has served as the Leagues President since 2007 becoming Commissioner in 2010 upon the retirement of founding Commissioner, Harvey Cochran.

Past, present, and future teams of the GSL

Current teams of the GSL 
At Large Division

North Division

East Division

A^ Inaugural season delayed to 2010.
B^ Played as a single team prior to 2009 season.

West Division

Defunct and former teams

Future teams 
In a series of press releases, the Great South League announced it would again expand in the 2011 season, to 30 teams in a seven state area. Likewise, the 2010 season will feature three divisions, each with 5-6 teams plus an "At Large" division. The North Division will consist of seven members joining from the Carolina-Virginia League. Meanwhile, the East and West Divisions will consist of both new teams and current members. A new team, the Tennessee Styx, will be in the "At Large" Division. The GSL has announced expansion plans for 2011 with two new Divisions, Northwest including teams from Tennessee: Knoxville, Athens, Cleveland, and Chattanooga TN and a Metro Atlanta Division consisting of 6 teams.

Championship history

2008 final standings 
North Division

South Division

References

External links
 Official website 

Summer baseball leagues
College baseball leagues in the United States
Baseball leagues in North Carolina
Baseball leagues in South Carolina
Baseball leagues in Virginia
Baseball leagues in Florida
Baseball leagues in Georgia (U.S. state)
Baseball leagues in Alabama